Man Met may refer to:
 Man Met Language, a language spoken in Jinghong County, China
 Manchester Metropolitan University, a university in Manchester, England